Following is a list of Ukrainian restaurants:

 Burger Club
 Dacha
 Kiev Restaurant
 Korchma Taras Bulba
 Veselka

Ukrainian